Troubles of a Bride is a 1924 American silent comedy film directed by Tom Buckingham and written by John Stone and Tom Buckingham. The film stars Robert Agnew, Mildred June, Alan Hale Sr., Bruce Covington, Dolores Rousse, and Heinie Conklin. The film was released on November 30, 1924, by the Fox Film Corporation.

Plot
As described in a review in a film magazine, escaping from the police, the Baron (Hale), a clever crook, learns that Colonel Patterson (Covington) plans to remodel his house to surprise his daughter Mildred (June) who is about to marry Robert Wallace. Impersonating the architect, he gains an entrée and finds the money supposed to be hidden in the house, but also determines to marry Mildred. He arranges a plot with her to kidnap her just before the wedding to test Robert’s love, as she has seen him kissing a vamp. The scheme works, but the Baron soon discloses his real purpose and attacks her. Robert comes to the rescue and there is a wild ride on a runaway train with Robert chasing it in a locomotive and rescuing Mildred just as the train is about to plunge into the river. Mildred is satisfied and accepts the Baron’s explanation when, realizing he is beaten, he declares it was all a part of the plan.

Cast            

Robert Agnew as Robert Wallace
Mildred June as Mildred Patterson
Alan Hale Sr. as Gordon Blake, the Baron
Bruce Covington as Colonel Patterson
Dolores Rousse as Vera
Heinie Conklin as Jeff 
Lew Harvey as Chauffeur
Bud Jamison as Architect
Jack Kenny as Minor Role (uncredited)

Production
Consistent with the practice at that time, the comic role of the servant Jeff was played by Conklin in blackface. The use of white actors in blackface for black character roles in Hollywood films did not begin to decline until the late 1930s, and is now considered highly offensive, disrespectful, and racist.

Preservation
With no prints of Troubles of a Bride located in any film archives, it is a lost film.

References

External links

1924 films
1920s English-language films
Silent American comedy films
1924 comedy films
Fox Film films
Films directed by Tom Buckingham
American silent feature films
American black-and-white films
1920s American films